Tikhonovo is a rural locality (a village) in Golovinskoye Rural Settlement, Sudogodsky District, Vladimir Oblast, Russia. The population was 3 as of 2010. There are 2 streets.

Geography 
Tikhonovo is located 10 km south-east from Golovino, 21 km west of Sudogda (the district's administrative centre) by road. Spirino is the nearest rural locality.

References 

Rural localities in Sudogodsky District